Andre Malan (cricketer)
 Andre Malan (journalist)